Billingsfors is a locality situated in Bengtsfors Municipality, Västra Götaland County, Sweden. It had 1,134 inhabitants in 2010. Billingsfors Church is in Billingsfors.

Sports
The following sports clubs are located in Billingsfors:
 Billingsfors IK

References

External links 

Populated places in Västra Götaland County
Populated places in Bengtsfors Municipality
Dalsland